The 2015 New York Red Bulls II season is the club's first season of existence, and their first in United Soccer League, the third-tier of the American soccer pyramid. The Red Bulls II play in the Eastern Division of USL.

Club

Coaching staff

Roster

Transfers

In

Out

Loans in

Loans out

Competitions

Preseason

USL

Standings

Results

U.S. Open Cup

USL Playoffs

Player statistics

Top scorers

As of  3 October 2015.

References 

New York Red Bulls II seasons
2015 USL season
American soccer clubs 2015 season
2015 in sports in New Jersey
2015 in sports in New York (state)